Before Him All Rome Trembled (Italian: Avanti a lui tremava tutta Roma) is a 1946 Italian musical war melodrama film directed by Carmine Gallone and starring Anna Magnani, Tito Gobbi and Hans Hinrich. Ada and Marco are a pair of opera singers, who moonlight working for the Italian resistance at the time of the German occupation of Rome during the Second World War. They are sheltering a British soldier with whom they make contact with the advancing Allied forces. Sylistically the film is a hybrid between filmed performances of opera, and a neorealistic resistance melodrama.

The title refers to Giacomo Puccini's Tosca, which is performed during the film.

Cast
 Anna Magnani as Ada  
 Tito Gobbi as Marco  
 Hans Hinrich as German Officer
 Gino Sinimberghi as Frank, the British soldier
 Guido Notari as Doctor 
 Tino Scotti as Mechanic 
 Guglielmo Sinaz as Stagehand 
 Joop van Hulzen as Webb 
 Giuseppe Varni as Stagehand  
 Carlo Duse as Police Officer  
 Edda Albertini as Lena 
 Heinrich Bode as German Soldier  
 Antonio Crast
 Giulio Neri
 Ave Ninchi

References

Bibliography 
 Bayman, Louis & Rigoletto, Sergio. Popular Italian Cinema. Palgrave Macmillan, 2013.

External links 
 

1946 films
1946 musical films
1940s war films
Italian musical films
Italian war films
1940s Italian-language films
Films directed by Carmine Gallone
Italian black-and-white films
Films based on operas
Films about singers
Films set in Rome
Films set in 1944
Italian Campaign of World War II films
Films about Italian resistance movement
Minerva Film films
Melodrama films
Opera films
Films scored by Renzo Rossellini
Italian World War II films
1940s Italian films